Grorud is a borough of Oslo, Norway. 

Grorud may also refer to:

Norway
Grorud (station), a rapid transit station on the Oslo Metro
Grorud IL, a football club from Grorud
Grorud Line, a line on the Oslo Metro
Grorud Station, a railway station on the Trunk Line in Grorud
Grorud Valley, a valley and urban area in Oslo
Grorud Church, a historic church in Grorud

People
Lars Grorud (born 1983), Norwegian footballer
Mats Grorud (born 1976), Norwegian film director